Dubrovin is a Russian masculine surname, its feminine counterpart is Dubrovina. It may refer to
 Alexander Dubrovin (1855–?), Russian right-wing politician
 Boris Dubrovin (mathematician) (1950–2019), Russian mathematician
Boris Dubrovin (poet) (1926–2020), Russian poet and songwriter
 Elizaveta Dubrovina (born 1993), Russian acrobatic gymnast
 Evgeny Dubrovin (born 1986), Russian ice hockey player
 Konstantin Dubrovin (born 1977), Ukrainian swimmer
 Stanislav Dubrovin (born 1974), Russian football player
 Sergei Dubrovin (born 1982), Russian football player
 Serghei Dubrovin (born 1952), Moldovan football manager
 Yuri Dubrovin (born 1984), Russian football player

See also 
 Dubrovin Farm in Israel

Russian-language surnames